The Importance Value Index in Ecology, is the measure of how dominant a species is in a given ecosystem.

References 

Indexes
Ecology
Biodiversity